The 2016 Wyoming Cowboys football team represented the University of Wyoming during the 2016 NCAA Division I FBS football season. The Cowboys were coached by third year head coach Craig Bohl and played their home games at War Memorial Stadium. They participated in the Mountain Division of the Mountain West Conference. They finished the season 8–6, 6–2 in Mountain West play to finish in a three-way tie for the Mountain Division championship. After tiebreakers, they represented the Mountain Division in, and hosted, the Mountain West Championship Game where they lost to San Diego State. They were invited to the Poinsettia Bowl where they lost to BYU.

Previous season
The Cowboys finished 2–10, with a 2–6 record in Mountain West play to finish last in the Mountain Division. Running back Brian Hill set the school record for most rushing yards in a single season with 1,631.

2016 recruiting class
Prior to National signing day, Wyoming signed cornerback Rico Gafford from Iowa Western Community College on December 16, 2015. On National Signing Day, Wyoming signed 22 high school players to National Letters of Intent. On March 1, 2016, the Cowboys announced the signing of defensive end Taniela Lolohea from El Camino College, making him the 24th member of the 2016 recruiting class. With the signing of defensive tackle Hunter Van Emmerik from College of the Redwoods, the 2016 recruiting class was complete.

Pre-season
At Mountain West media days, the Cowboys were picked to finish last in the Mountain Division. Additionally, three players were named to the pre–season all–conference team: junior running back Brian Hill, senior offensive lineman Chase Roullier, and sophomore free safety Andrew Wingard. Hill was also named to the watchlists for the Maxwell Award and the Doak Walker Award, Roullier was named to the watchlists for the Outland Trophy and the Lombardi Award, Wingard was named to the watchlist for the Jim Thorpe Award, and senior punter Ethan Wood was named to the watchlist for the Ray Guy Award.

Schedule

Schedule Source:

Personnel

Coaching staff

Roster

Statistics
source:

Team

Offense

Defense

Key: SOLO: Solo Tackles, AST: Assisted Tackles, TOT: Total Tackles, TFL: Tackles-for-loss, SACK: Quarterback Sacks, INT: Interceptions, BU: Passes Broken Up, QBH: Quarterback Hits, FF: Forced Fumbles, FR: Fumbles Recovered, BLK: Kicks or Punts Blocked, SAF: Safeties

Special teams

Scores by quarter (all opponents)

Awards and honors

All–Conference Teams

First Team:

Brian Hill, Jr., RB

Jacob Hollister, Sr., TE

Chase Roullier, Sr., OL

Andrew Wingard, So., DB

Second Team

Josh Allen, So., QB

Tanner Gentry, Sr., WR

D.J. May, Sr., RET

Honorable Mention

Lucas Wacha, Sr., LB

Conference Awards
Craig Bohl – Coach of the Year

Logan Wilson – Freshman of the Year

All–America Teams
Chase Roullier, Sr., OL – 2nd Team (USA Today)

Brian Hill, Jr., RB – 3rd Team (College Sports Madness)

Logan Wilson, Fr., LB – Freshman All–American (USA Today, FWAA)

Senior Bowls
Chase Roullier – East–West Shrine Game

Lucas Wacha – NFLPA Collegiate Bowl

Box Scores

Northern Illinois

 Passing leaders: Josh Allen (UW): 19–29, 245 YDS, 2 TD; Drew Hare (NIU): 24–39, 329 YDS, 3 TD
 Rushing leaders: Brian Hill (UW): 33 CAR, 125 YDS, 2 TD; Kenny Golladay (NIU): 6 CAR, 82 YDS, 1 TD
 Receiving leaders: Jake Maulhardt (UW): 5 REC, 106 YDS; Kenny Golladay (NIU): 10 REC, 144 YDS, 2 TD

at Nebraska

 Passing leaders: Josh Allen (UW): 16–32, 189 YDS, 1 TD; Tommy Armstrong Jr. (NEB): 20–34, 377 YDS, 3 TD
 Rushing leaders: Austin Conway (UW): 3 CAR, 70 YDS; Devine Ozigbo (NEB): 15 CAR, 44 YDS, 1 TD
 Receiving leaders: Tanner Gentry (UW): 7 REC, 124 YDS, 1 TD; Alonzo Moore (NEB): 3 REC, 109 YDS, 1 TD

UC Davis

 Passing leaders: Josh Allen (UW): 11–15, 198 YDS, 3 TD; Ben Scott (UCD): 18–31, 178 YDS, 1 TD, 1 INT
 Rushing leaders: Brian Hill (UW): 25 CAR, 207 YDS, 2 TD; Joshua Kelley (UCD): 7 CAR, 46 YDS
 Receiving leaders: C.J. Johnson (UW): 3 REC, 67 YDS, 1 TD; Keelan Doss (UCD): 7 REC, 104 YDS, 1 TD

at Eastern Michigan

 Passing leaders: Josh Allen (UW): 19–29, 234 YDS, 1 INT; Todd Porter (EMU): 14–28, 214 YDS, 1 TD, 4 INT
 Rushing leaders: Brian Hill (UW): 22 CAR, 82 YDS, 1 TD; Ian Eriksen (EMU): 27 CAR, 120 YDS, 1 TD
 Receiving leaders: Tanner Gentry (UW): 12 REC, 127 YDS; Nigel Kilby (EMU): 4 REC, 84 YDS

at Colorado State

 Passing leaders: Josh Allen (UW): 7–18, 165 YDS, 1 TD; Collin Hill (CSU): 23–41, 370 YDS, 1 TD, 1 INT
 Rushing leaders: Brian Hill (UW): 19 CAR, 166 YDS, 1 TD; Izzy Matthews (CSU): 5 CAR, 38 YDS
 Receiving leaders: Tanner Gentry (UW): 3 REC, 91 YDS, 1 TD; Michael Gallup (CSU): 4 REC, 75 YDS

Air Force

 Passing leaders: Josh Allen (UW): 15–27, 173 YDS, 3 TD; Nate Romine (AF): 6–19, 188 YDS, 2 TD, 3 INT
 Rushing leaders: Brian Hill (UW): 29 CAR, 92 YDS, 1 TD; D.J. Johnson (AF): 7 CAR, 73 YDS
 Receiving leaders: Jake Maulhardt (UW): 3 REC, 42 YDS, 1 TD; Jalen Robinette (AF): 3 REC, 101 YDS, 1 TD

at Nevada

 Passing leaders: Josh Allen (UW): 8–12, 135 YDS; Ty Gangi (NEV): 27–43, 300 YDS, 1 TD, 1 INT
 Rushing leaders: Brian Hill (UW): 29 CAR, 289 YDS, 3 TD; James Butler (NEV): 14 CAR, 73 YDS, 2 TD
 Receiving leaders: Tanner Gentry (UW): 4 REC, 109 YDS; Wyatt Demps (NEV): 8 REC, 97 YDS

Boise State

 Passing leaders: Josh Allen (UW): 18–31, 274 YDS, 3 TD, 1 INT; Brett Rypien (BSU): 22–35, 295 YDS, 1 INT
 Rushing leaders: Brian Hill (UW): 28 CAR, 146 YDS; Jeremy McNichols (BSU): 18 CAR, 143 YDS, 2 TD
 Receiving leaders: Jacob Hollister (UW): 6 REC, 144 YDS, 2 TD; Cedrick Wilson Jr. (BSU): 4 REC, 84 YDS

Utah State

 Passing leaders: Josh Allen (UW): 16–26, 261 YDS, 4 TD, 1 INT; Kent Meyers (USU): 17–29, 235 YDS, 1 TD
 Rushing leaders: Brian Hill (UW): 25 CAR, 142 YDS, 2 TD; Tonny Lindsey (USU): 5 CAR, 75 YDS
 Receiving leaders: Tanner Gentry (UW): 4 REC, 93 YDS, 2 TD; Ron'Quavion Tarver (USU): 8 REC, 104 YDS

at UNLV

 Passing leaders: Josh Allen (UW): 14–31, 334 YDS, 4 TD, 2 INT; Kurt Palandech (UNLV): 20–32, 252 YDS, 3 TD
 Rushing leaders: Brian Hill (UW): 23 CAR, 119 YDS, 3 TD; Kurt Palandech (UNLV): 16 CAR, 157 YDS, 1 TD
 Receiving leaders: Tanner Gentry (UW): 5 REC, 184 YDS, 3 TD; Devonte Boyd (UNLV): 10 REC, 127 YDS

San Diego State

 Passing leaders: Josh Allen (UW): 16–31, 282 YDS, 2 TD, 1 INT; Christian Chapman (SDSU): 15–26, 211 YDS, 2 TD
 Rushing leaders: Brian Hill (UW): 31 CAR, 131 YDS, 2 TD; Rashaad Penny (SDSU): 5 CAR, 79 YDS
 Receiving leaders: C.J. Johnson (UW): 5 REC, 85 YDS, 1 TD; Donnel Pumphrey (SDSU): 5 REC, 52 YDS

at New Mexico

 Passing leaders: Josh Allen (UW): 18–28, 248 YDS; Lamar Jordan (UNM): 4–5, 122 YDS, 1 TD
 Rushing leaders: Brian Hill (UW): 26 CAR, 126 YDS, 3 TD; Teriyon Gipson (UNM): 13 CAR, 217 YDS, 2 TD
 Receiving leaders: Tanner Gentry (UW): 5 REC, 112 YDS; Richard McQuarley (UNM): 2 REC, 58 YDS

San Diego State–Mountain West Championship Game

 
 Passing leaders: Josh Allen (UW): 14–31, 248 YDS, 3 TD, 2 INT; Christian Chapman (SDSU): 6–13, 85 YDS, 1 INT
 Rushing leaders: Brian Hill (UW): 16 CAR, 93 YDS; Rashaad Penny (SDSU): 16 CAR, 117 YDS, 2 TD
 Receiving leaders: Tanner Gentry (UW): 3 REC, 81 YDS, 1 TD; Mikah Holder (SDSU): 2 REC, 56 YDS

BYU–Poinsettia Bowl

 Passing leaders: Josh Allen (UW): 17–32, 207 YDS, 2 TD, 2 INT; Tanner Mangum (BYU): 8–15, 96 YDS, 1 TD, 1 INT 
 Rushing leaders: Brian Hill (UW): 23 CAR, 93 YDS, 1 TD; Jamaal Williams (BYU): 26 CAR, 210 YDS, 1 TD 
 Receiving leaders: Tanner Gentry (UW): 7 REC, 113 YDS, 2 TD; Nick Kurtz (BYU): 3 REC, 59 YDS

Players in the 2017 NFL Draft

References

Wyoming
Wyoming Cowboys football seasons
Wyoming Cowboys football